Bertram William Mathyson Francis Stevens (8 October 1872 – 14 February 1922) was Australian journal editor (Single Tax; Native Companion; Art in Australia; Lone Hand); literary and art critic; and anthologist (An Anthology of Australian Verse [which contained five poems by Henry Lawson]; The Golden Treasury of Australian Verse).

Stevens was born at Inverell, New South Wales, the eldest child of William Mathison Stevens and his wife Marian, née Cafe, from Queanbeyan. By 1882 Stevens moved with his family to Newtown, Sydney where he was educated at public schools. Stevens was an avid reader and developed a wide knowledge and culture. In 1895 he began a fifteen-year period as a solicitor's clerk and it was intended that he should study law. During this time Stevens worked as a freelance journalist, coming into contact with a number of literary figures, he edited My Sundowner and other Poems (1904) by John Farrell with a memoir. Stevens prepared An Anthology of Australian Verse (1906), in which he was hampered by copyright restrictions, but he had a much freer hand in The Golden Treasury of Australian Verse (1909), the first anthology of Australasian verse of any importance. In the same year he had the difficult task of succeeding Alfred Stephens as editor of the 'Red Page' of The Bulletin. David Scott Mitchell gave him access to his library of Australiana.

At the end of 1911 Stevens became editor of the Lone Hand and conducted this journal for seven years. In 1916 Stevens was one of the founders and joint-editor (with Sydney Ure Smith) of Art in Australia until his death. He also did literary criticism for The Sydney Mail and other journals, published editions of Australian poets, prepared other anthologies, and edited books on leading Australian artists. Much of his literary work is listed in Serle's Bibliography of Australasian Poetry and Verse and Miller's Australian Literature.

Stevens campaigned for the land policies of Henry George, temporarily winning Henry Lawson to the cause. He was a founding member of the Dawn and Dusk Club in 1899 and of the Casuals Club in 1906. Stevens was deeply involved with attempts at rehabilitating Henry Lawson at Yanco, New South Wales and Edwin Brady's property at Mallacoota, Victoria.

Stevens died suddenly of cerebral haemorrhage and chronic nephritis at Sydney, on 14 February 1922. He left a widow, two sons and a daughter. Henry Lawson wrote a warm confessional tribute in The Bulletin. At the time of his death he was vice-president of the New South Wales Institute of Journalists. He had been preparing A History of Australian Literature for some years before his death, but this was never published. Many of his papers are at the Mitchell library, Sydney.

Bibliography

Poetry anthologies
 An Anthology of Australian Verse (1907)
 The Australian Birthday Book : Passages Selected from Australia and New Zealand Poetry (1908) 
 The Golden Treasury of Australian Verse (1909) 
 Selections from the Australian Poets  (1913)
 The Children's Treasury of Australian Verse (1913)
 A Book of Australian Verse for Boys and Girls (1915) 
 The Australian Soldiers' Gift Book (1916)
 The Bulletin Book of Humorous Verses and Recitations (1920)

Selected work

 My Sundowner and Other Poems by John Farrell (1904)
 Wine and Roses by Victor J. Daley (1911)
 Oswald Watt, Lieut.-Colonel A.F.C., O.B.E., Legion of Honour, Croix de Guerre : a tribute to his memory by a few of his friends edited with Ernest Watt and Ure Smith (1921)

References

External links
 
 
 

1872 births
1922 deaths
People from New South Wales
Australian literary critics
Australian editors
Georgists